Maayan is a 2001 Indian Tamil-language drama film, directed by Nassar. The film stars himself, Roja and Vindhya, while Thalaivasal Vijay, Ranjitha and Vadivelu among others form an ensemble cast.  Music for the film was composed by Deva and the film opened to mixed reviews in September 2001.

Cast 

 Nassar as Maayan
 Roja as Azhagamma
 Ranjitha as Gurumayi
 Pasupathy as Dominic Raj
 Vindhya
 Revathi
 Thalaivasal Vijay as Vengala Naidu
 Vadivukkarasi
 Vadivelu
 Bala Singh
 Thyagu
 K. R. Vatsala
 Mu Ramaswamy as Maayan's father
 Elango Kumaravel

Production 
Nassar had originally planned only to direct the film, but after his initial choices for the lead actor - Prashanth and Ajith Kumar - pulled out, he chose to also portray the lead role. As a result, the film's production was delayed by over a year from early 1999. Actress Ranjitha made a comeback to acting with Maayan, after taking a three-year sabbatical post-marriage. The film also marked the first major role for Pasupathy, whose previous venture Marudhanayagam was shelved.

The first schedule of the shooting was held at Chennai and Chengelpet. The second schedule was then held at Tiruvannamalai and the forests of Thalaikonam.

Soundtrack 
Soundtrack was composed by Deva.

References 

2001 films
2000s Tamil-language films
Indian drama films
Films scored by Deva (composer)